The 2017 Croatia Open Umag  (also known as the Plava Laguna Croatia Open Umag for sponsorship reasons) was a men's tennis tournament played on outdoor clay courts. It was the 28th edition of the Croatia Open, and part of the ATP World Tour 250 Series of the 2017 ATP World Tour. It took place at the International Tennis Center in Umag, Croatia, from 17 July through 23 July 2017.

Singles main draw entrants

Seeds 

 1 Rankings are as of July 3, 2017

Other entrants 
The following players received wildcards into the singles main draw:
  Ivan Dodig
  David Goffin
  Marc Polmans

The following players received entry from the qualifying draw:
  Attila Balázs
  Kenny de Schepper
  Marco Trungelliti
  Miljan Zekić

The following player received entry as a lucky loser:
  Andrey Rublev

Withdrawals 
Before the tournament
  Borna Ćorić →replaced by  Andrey Rublev
  Andreas Haider-Maurer →replaced by  Alessandro Giannessi
  Martin Kližan →replaced by  Andrej Martin
  Philipp Kohlschreiber →replaced by  Marco Cecchinato
  Yūichi Sugita →replaced by  Norbert Gombos

Doubles main draw entrants

Seeds 

 Rankings are as of July 3, 2017

Other entrants 
The following pairs received wildcards into the doubles main draw:
  Borna Ćorić /  Nino Serdarušić
  Marin Draganja /  Tomislav Draganja

Withdrawals 
Before the tournament
  Borna Ćorić
  João Sousa

Champions

Singles 

  Andrey Rublev def.  Paolo Lorenzi, 6–4, 6–2

Doubles 

  Guillermo Durán /  Andrés Molteni def.  Marin Draganja /  Tomislav Draganja, 6–3, 6–7(4–7), [10–6]

References

External links 
 Official website

Croatia Open Umag
2017
2017 in Croatian tennis